Danilo Pennone (born July 14, 1963, in Rome) is an Italian writer.

Biography
An Arts graduate, Pennone teaches in Rome. His first published works, essays on Celtic mythology, date back to the eighties. In 2008, his first novel, Confessioni di una mente criminale (Confessions of a Criminal Mind), was published from which has been adapted the theatrical production of the same name, staged at the Todi Art Festival 2009, under the artistic direction of Maurizio Costanzo, and in the Roman prisons Regina Coeli and Rebibbia.

He has recorded three CDs, sharing lyrics and musical credits as a co-author. In 2007, a production of his musical comedy Era l'estate dell'amore (That was the Summer of Love) was performed in Rome, directed by Greg, with Pennone as writer of both the script and music.

The story Grand Hotel due omicidi is shortlisted at the 2019 Giallo Ceresio Award,.

Since 2006, he has taught History of Cinema at the University of Rome 'La Sapienza'.

Bibliography

Stories
Diversivo coniugale, Storie, No 27/28, 1997
Grand Hotel due omicidi, Delitti di lago 4, No 4, Morellini Editore, 2020 –

Novels
Confessioni di una mente criminale, Newton Compton Editori, 2008 –

Inspector Mario Ventura 
Il cadavere del lago (Le indagini del commissario Ventura Vol. 1), Newton Compton Editori, 2019 – 
Delitto alle saline (Le indagini del commissario Ventura Vol. 2), Newton Compton Editori, 2020 – 
Delitto di Ferragosto  (Le indagini del commissario Ventura Vol. 3), Newton Compton Editori, 2022 –

Essays
Il ritorno di Finn Mac Cool, Abstracta, No 41, 1989
I druidi d'Irlanda, Abstracta, No 51, 1990
Le fate irlandesi, Conservazione, No 13, 1990
I Celti, miti e leggende, Stile Regina Editore, 1990
La semiosi dello specchio e il suo uso simbolico nel cinema americano, Cimena, No 3, 2006– 
Brian O'Nolan: uno scrittore tra eccentricità e sperimentazione, Avanguardia, No 34, 2007
Il cibo e la fame nel cinema picaresco di Sergio Citti, Cimena, No 4, 2008– 
Cinema spagnolo, Cineuropa. Storia del cinema europeo, 2009– 
Cinema portoghese, Cineuropa. Storia del cinema europeo, 2009–

Plays 
2007, Era l'estate dell'amore
2009, Confessioni di una mente criminale
2012, Un, deux, trois… Pam, Ham!

Discography 
2004, Benedetto amore (Interbeat INTS 20-04)
2006, Bastava che ci capissimo io e i miei (Interbeat INT 01-06), Storie di Note
2009, Il paese che non-c'è (Interbeat INTS 09)
2012, Straniero (Interbeat – Musica&Teste M&T 03-12), Egea

Notes

See also

Crime novel
Music
Theater

21st-century Italian novelists
Celtic mythology
Italian songwriters
Male songwriters
Living people
Musicians from Rome
1963 births
Italian male novelists
21st-century Italian male writers